Jonathan Ross Presents for One Week Only is a 1990 documentary presented by Jonathan Ross, in which he interviewed filmmakers including David Lynch, Aki Kaurismäki, Alejandro Jodorowsky and in 2014, the Spanish filmmaker, Pedro Almodovar.

Alejandro Jodorowsky
The documentary presents a sober look at the behind the scenes machinations of the film industry for Jodorowsky's films up until that point. Films discussed include: Fando y Lis, El Topo, The Holy Mountain, Santa Sangre and Jodorowsky's failed project of Dune. It also features candid interviews with Dennis Hopper, Omar Sharif and Marcel Marceau.

References

Documentary films about film directors and producers
1990 British television series debuts
1991 British television series endings
1990s British documentary television series
Channel 4 original programming
English-language television shows